The Tribunal de commerce de Paris ("Paris commercial court[house]"), until 1968 Tribunal de commerce de la Seine, refers both to the tribunal de commerce of Paris, a commercial court, and to the building that hosts it on the Île de la Cité in Paris.

Court

Like other such institutions, it was renamed tribunal de commerce in August 1790 during the French Revolution. In 1826, it moved to the newly built Palais Brongniart, also home of the Paris Bourse.

Building

In 1857, the  decided the construction of a new building for the Tribunal de Commerce and the conseil des prud'hommes, which later moved to a separate location. Part of the grounds that were reserved for it had been the location of the ancient . Following its demolition in 1791, the church had been replaced by entertainment venues, first the Théâtre de la Cité-Variétés and then the  ballroom. That building and nearby houses, in turn, were demolished in 1858 for the complete remodeling of the middle section of the Île de la Cité, a major project of Haussmann's renovation of Paris.

The courthouse building for the Tribunal de Commerce was built between 1859 and 1865 on a design by architect Antoine-Nicolas Bailly, inspired by the Renaissance Palazzo della Loggia in Brescia. In the 1930s, it underwent a remodeling that transformed the atrium's ceiling and lower parts of the northern façade, but has otherwise been largely preserved in its original state.

Above these is a decorated pediment supported by four figures sculpted by Albert-Ernest Carrier-Belleuse. The ornate octagonal dome rises to a height of 45 meters and is the building's most distinctive exterior feature. It is positioned to close the perspective of the Boulevard de Sébastopol, and as a consequence, is not aligned with the center of the building's façade.

The interior is organized around two monumental spaces: to the east, a columned atrium, and to the west, a monumental staircase under the building's dome, entered through a vestibule decorated by a pair of monumental lions sculpted by Pierre Louis Rouillard. Above these are 16 caryatids by sculptor , and the dome's ceiling with representations of the City of Paris, Arts, the City of Marseille, Grain harvest, the City of Lyon, Industry, the City of Bordeaux, and Grape-harvest, by Armand Félix Marie Jobbé-Duval.

Gallery

See also
 Palais de la Cité
 Paris Police Prefecture

Notes

Courthouses in France
Courts in France
Second Empire architecture
Île de la Cité